Buffy Sainte-Marie: Starwalker is a Canadian television special, which was broadcast by CBC Television and APTN on September 30, 2022. Staged at the National Arts Centre to mark the National Day of Truth and Reconciliation, the program was a tribute concert featuring musicians and dancers performing the songs of Indigenous Canadian singer-songwriter Buffy Sainte-Marie.

The special received two Canadian Screen Award nominations at the 11th Canadian Screen Awards in 2023, for Best Performing Arts Program and Best Sound in a Lifestyle, Reality or Entertainment Program or Series.

Performers
The Halluci Nation, "Bodyslam/You Got to Run (Spirit of the Wind)"
Crystal Shawanda, "Bury My Heart at Wounded Knee"
Jera Wolfe, "Moonshot" (dance piece)
William Prince and Marie-Mai, "Up Where We Belong"
Leela Gilday, "Darling Don't Cry"
Jeremy Dutcher, "Universal Soldier"
Willam Prince and The Tragically Hip, "Now That the Buffalo's Gone"
Alanis Obomsawin, spoken word piece set to Sainte-Marie's score for the film Where the Spirit Lives
Marie-Mai, "Until It's Time for You to Go"
Logan Staats, "Cod'ine"
Buffy Sainte-Marie, "You Got to Run (Spirit of the Wind)"

References

2022 television specials
2022 in Canadian television
Canadian television specials
Tribute concerts